Ian James McCoshen (born August 5, 1995) is an American professional ice hockey defenseman who is currently playing under contract with Ässät in the Liiga. McCoshen was selected by the Florida Panthers in the second round, 31st overall, of the 2013 NHL Entry Draft.

Playing career

Amateur

Youth 
As a youth, McCoshen played in the 2007 Quebec International Pee-Wee Hockey Tournament with a minor ice hockey team from Minnesota.

High school 
McCoshen played three seasons (2010–13) of Tier 1 junior ice hockey with the Waterloo Black Hawks of the United States Hockey League (USHL). He was selected to both the 2012 and 2013 USHL/NHL Top Prospects Game, and in his final season, he was further recognized for his outstanding play when he was named to the 2012–13 USHL First All-Star Team.

College 
McCoshen got off to a strong start in his NCAA campaign at Boston College with a 13-point year as a top defensemen for the Eagles ice hockey team. He scored Boston College's first goal of the season and was on SportsCenter's Top-10 plays for his goal-saving effort in a game against the University of Minnesota. He also earned rookie of the week honors for his game-winning goal against the University of Massachusetts Lowell during the NCAA tournament. McCoshen played at the 2014 World Juniors for the United States.

Professional

Florida Panthers 
At the completion of his junior year with the Eagles in 2015–16, McCoshen concluded his collegiate career in signing a three-year, entry-level contract with the Florida Panthers on June 19, 2016.

McCoshen finished his first professional season skating in three NHL games, his NHL debut coming on April 6, 2017, in a 6–3 loss to the St. Louis Blues. He also recorded his first point (an assist) in the game.

Chicago Blackhawks 
On October 22, 2019, McCoshen was traded by the Panthers to the Chicago Blackhawks in exchange for Aleksi Saarela. He was assigned to report to the Blackhawks AHL affiliate, the Rockford IceHogs. Unable to earn a recalled to the Blackhawks, McCoshen remained with the IceHogs, posting 2 goals and 8 points in 56 games before the season was cancelled due to the COVID-19 pandemic.

As an impending restricted free agent, McCoshen was non-tendered a qualifying offer by the Blackhawks, and was released to free agency on October 8, 2020.

Minnesota Wild
On October 19, 2020, McCoshen agree to a one-year, two-way contract with the Minnesota Wild. McCoshen was assigned to the AHL and played exclusively with affiliate, the Iowa Wild for the 2020–21 season, collecting 4 assists through 11 contests.

Later years
As a free agent from the Wild, McCoshen was un-signed over the summer before accepting an invitation to attend the Vegas Golden Knights 2021 training camp in preparation for the  season. After participating in training camp and pre-season, McCoshen was re-assigned to join AHL affiliate, the Henderson Silver Knights on a professional tryout basis on October 2, 2021.

As a free agent from the Silver Knights in the following off-season, McCoshen signed his first contact abroad in agreeing to a one-year contract in Finland with Ässät of the Liiga on August 15, 2022.

Personal
McCoshen is the son of Kevin and Colleen McCoshen. Kevin graduated from Superior Senior High School in Wisconsin, and Colleen is originally from Menomonie, Wisconsin. Ian also has three younger sisters: Mary, Allyson and Grace. McCoshen was born in Anaheim, California, and the family lived in Hudson, Wisconsin, for 13 years before moving for Faribault, Minnesota, where he attended Shattuck-Saint Mary's and skated for the school's bantam team in 2009–10.

Career statistics

Regular season and playoffs

International

Awards and honors

References

External links

1995 births
Living people
American men's ice hockey defensemen
Boston College Eagles men's ice hockey players
Florida Panthers draft picks
Florida Panthers players
Henderson Silver Knights players
Ice hockey players from California
Iowa Wild players
People from Anaheim, California
Rockford IceHogs (AHL) players
Springfield Thunderbirds players
Waterloo Black Hawks players